Schladitzer See is a lake in Landkreis Nordsachsen, Saxony, Germany. At an elevation of 104 m, its surface area is 2.18 km². The lake is a part of the Central German Lake District.

References 

Lakes of Saxony
Nordsachsen